Aecidium campanulastri is a species of fungus in the Pucciniales order. A plant pathogen, it was described as new to science in 1910.

References 

Fungal plant pathogens and diseases
Pucciniales
Fungi described in 1911
Fungi of North America